About a Girl is an LP album by Canadian indie pop band Winter Gloves. It was released on 24 March 2009 by Paper Bag Records.

The album was primarily recorded in lo-fi by Charles F., using only one microphone and a combination of amped and unplugged instruments. Errant noises were intentionally mixed into songs to achieve "a pleasant dirty sound". Most of the songs fit in the second wave synthpop genre popularized in the early 2000s, although reviews correlate the song structures and instrumentation to the later revival of dance-punk and electronic dance music in general.

Track listing

Personnel 
Charles F. – vocals, Wurlitzer, pipe organ
Vincent Chalifour – synth bass, keyboards
Pat Sayers – drums
Louis Fernandez – guitar
Jon Drew – producer, mixing engineer
Peter van Llyfanck – mastering engineer
James Mejia – album artist

References

External links 
 

2009 albums
Winter Gloves albums
Paper Bag Records albums